Anglican Church ("English Church") refers to Christian churches in the Anglican tradition.

Anglican Church may refer to:
 The Church of England
 The Anglican Communion or one of its member churches
 Anglican Church (Bordighera), in Italy
 Anglican Church (Bucharest), in Romania
 Anglican realignment
 Continuing Anglican movement